Ready... Set... Cook! is a cooking game show that debuted on the Food Network in the US on October 2, 1995. The show's format was based upon the UK series Ready Steady Cook, and originally hosted by television personality Robin Young.

Hosts
Young hosted through September 27, 1996. The following Monday, she was replaced by another TV personality, Sissy Biggers. In 2000, Biggers was replaced by UK Ready Steady Cook presenter Ainsley Harriott.

Gameplay
Two well-known chefs (usually representing their restaurants) along with two members of the studio audience (one per chef) competed as teams to prepare the best meal. One was called "Red Tomatoes", the other "Green Peppers". The contestants were then each given $10.00 to spend on whatever they wanted for the chefs to prepare for a meal.

The teams were given 20 minutes (later reduced to 18 minutes) to make a meal using the ingredients they had and the usual items found in a kitchen pantry. The host would meanwhile move back and forth between the teams to ask questions about the meals being produced.

When time ran out, each team explained the dish they had prepared, after which the audience would vote by holding cards (one per audience member, a tomato on one side and a green pepper on the other) to show which team's meal they liked best. The team with the higher number of votes won the game, with both contestants winning kitchen appliances and/or cookware.

References

External links 
 
1990s American cooking television series
2000s American cooking television series
1990s American game shows
2000s American game shows
Food Network original programming
Cooking competitions in the United States
American television series based on British television series
1995 American television series debuts
2001 American television series endings